England competed at the 1982 Commonwealth Games in Brisbane, Queensland, Australia, from 30 September to 9 October 1982.

England finished second in the medal table.

Medal table (top three)

The athletes that competed are listed below.

Archery

Athletics

Badminton

Bowls

Boxing

Cycling

Diving

Shooting

Swimming

Weightlifting

Wrestling

References

1982
Nations at the 1982 Commonwealth Games
Commonwealth Games